The 1996–97 NBA season was the Rockets' 30th season in the National Basketball Association, and 26th season in Houston. During the off-season, the Rockets acquired All-Star forward Charles Barkley from the Phoenix Suns, and signed free agents Kevin Willis, Brent Price, undrafted rookie guard Matt Maloney, and re-signed former Rockets forward and three-point specialist Matt Bullard, who was a member of the championship team from the 1994 NBA Finals. The Rockets began the season with a 21–2 start, but later on struggled posting a six-game losing streak between January and February, and held a 32–16 record at the All-Star break. At midseason, the team signed free agents Eddie Johnson and Sedale Threatt, as the Rockets won 14 of their final 17 games, finishing second in the Midwest Division with a 57–25 record.

Hakeem Olajuwon averaged 23.2 points, 9.2 rebounds and 2.2 blocks per game, and was named to the All-NBA First Team, NBA All-Defensive Second Team, and finished in seventh place in Most Valuable Player voting, while Barkley averaged 19.2 points and 13.5 rebounds per game, but only played 53 games due to ankle and hip injuries, and Clyde Drexler provided the team with 18.0 points, 6.0 rebounds, 5.7 assists and 1.9 steals per game, but only played 62 games due to a hamstring injury. Olajuwon, Barkley, Drexler and head coach Rudy Tomjanovich all represented the Western Conference during the 1997 NBA All-Star Game. However, Barkley and Drexler did not play due to injuries; it was also the final All-Star selections for Olajuwon, Barkley and Drexler. In addition, Mario Elie contributed 11.7 points per game, while Willis provided with 11.2 points and 7.5 rebounds per game, and Maloney contributed 9.4 points per game, led the team with 154 three-point field goals, and was named to the NBA All-Rookie Second Team.

In the Western Conference First Round of the playoffs, the Rockets swept the Minnesota Timberwolves in three straight games. In the Western Conference Semi-finals, they jumped out to a 3–1 series lead over the Seattle SuperSonics. However, the Sonics would win the next two games to even the series at three games a piece. The Rockets would win Game 7 and advanced to the Western Conference Finals, where they faced regular season MVP Karl Malone, John Stockton and the Utah Jazz. The Jazz won the first two games at home, but the Rockets would even the series at two games a piece as Johnson hit a three-point buzzer beater to win Game 4, 95–92 at home. However, the Rockets would lose to the Jazz in six games. The Jazz would reach the NBA Finals for the first time, but would lose to the defending champion Chicago Bulls in six games.

Following the season, Threatt retired and three-point specialist Sam Mack was traded to the Vancouver Grizzlies. After the departures of Barkley, Olajuwon and Drexler, the Rockets did not reach the Conference Finals again until 2015, where they were defeated by the Golden State Warriors in five games.

Offseason
During the 1996 offseason, Charles Barkley was traded from the Phoenix Suns in exchange for Sam Cassell, Robert Horry, Mark Bryant, and Chucky Brown. Barkley chose Houston specifically because he hoped to win an NBA Championship with the team.

Draft picks

Roster

Regular season
In his first game with the Houston Rockets, Charles Barkley got 33 rebounds, a career high.

Season standings

c – clinched conference title
y – clinched division title
x – clinched playoff spot

Record vs. opponents

Game log

Playoffs

|- align="center" bgcolor="#ccffcc"
| 1
| April 24
| Minnesota
| W 112–95
| Mario Elie (21)
| Kevin Willis (13)
| Clyde Drexler (8)
| The Summit16,285
| 1–0
|- align="center" bgcolor="#ccffcc"
| 2
| April 26
| Minnesota
| W 96–84
| Charles Barkley (20)
| Charles Barkley (15)
| Clyde Drexler (7)
| The Summit16,285
| 2–0
|- align="center" bgcolor="#ccffcc"
| 3
| April 29
| @ Minnesota
| W 125–120
| Matt Maloney (26)
| Hakeem Olajuwon (11)
| Clyde Drexler (9)
| Target Center19,006
| 3–0
|-

|- align="center" bgcolor="#ccffcc"
| 1
| May 5
| Seattle
| W 112–102
| Clyde Drexler (22)
| Hakeem Olajuwon (11)
| Mario Elie (8)
| The Summit16,285
| 1–0
|- align="center" bgcolor="#ffcccc"
| 2
| May 7
| Seattle
| L 101–106
| Clyde Drexler (25)
| Hakeem Olajuwon (12)
| Clyde Drexler (8)
| The Summit16,285
| 1–1
|- align="center" bgcolor="#ccffcc"
| 3
| May 9
| @ Seattle
| W 97–93
| Hakeem Olajuwon (24)
| Hakeem Olajuwon (11)
| Sedale Threatt (5)
| KeyArena17,072
| 2–1
|- align="center" bgcolor="#ccffcc"
| 4
| May 11
| @ Seattle
| W 110–106 (OT)
| Maloney, Barkley (26)
| Charles Barkley (15)
| Hakeem Olajuwon (9)
| KeyArena17,072
| 3–1
|- align="center" bgcolor="#ffcccc"
| 5
| May 13
| Seattle
| L 94–100
| Hakeem Olajuwon (31)
| Charles Barkley (20)
| Mario Elie (6)
| The Summit16,285
| 3–2
|- align="center" bgcolor="#ffcccc"
| 6
| May 15
| @ Seattle
| L 96–99
| Hakeem Olajuwon (30)
| Charles Barkley (12)
| Clyde Drexler (6)
| KeyArena17,072
| 3–3
|- align="center" bgcolor="#ccffcc"
| 7
| May 17
| Seattle
| W 96–91
| Clyde Drexler (24)
| Charles Barkley (14)
| Mario Elie (11)
| The Summit16,285
| 4–3
|-

|- align="center" bgcolor="#ffcccc"
| 1
| May 19
| @ Utah
| L 86–101
| Hakeem Olajuwon (30)
| Hakeem Olajuwon (13)
| Hakeem Olajuwon (5)
| Delta Center19,911
| 0–1
|- align="center" bgcolor="#ffcccc"
| 2
| May 21
| @ Utah
| L 92–104
| Hakeem Olajuwon (30)
| Charles Barkley (12)
| Clyde Drexler (4)
| Delta Center19,911
| 0–2
|- align="center" bgcolor="#ccffcc"
| 3
| May 23
| Utah
| W 118–100
| Eddie Johnson (31)
| Charles Barkley (16)
| three players tied (6)
| The Summit16,285
| 1–2
|- align="center" bgcolor="#ccffcc"
| 4
| May 25
| Utah
| W 95–92
| Hakeem Olajuwon (27)
| Charles Barkley (16)
| Matt Maloney (6)
| The Summit16,285
| 2–2
|- align="center" bgcolor="#ffcccc"
| 5
| May 27
| @ Utah
| L 91–96
| Hakeem Olajuwon (33)
| Hakeem Olajuwon (10)
| Charles Barkley (5)
| Delta Center19,911
| 2–3
|- align="center" bgcolor="#ffcccc"
| 6
| May 29
| Utah
| L 100–103
| Clyde Drexler (33)
| Hakeem Olajuwon (11)
| Sedale Threatt (9)
| The Summit16,285
| 2–4
|-

Player statistics

NOTE: Please write the players statistics in alphabetical order by last name.

Season

Playoffs

Awards and records

Awards
Hakeem Olajuwon, All-NBA First Team
Hakeem Olajuwon, NBA All-Defensive Second Team
Matt Maloney, NBA All-Rookie Team 2nd Team

Records

Transactions

Trades

Free agents

Additions

Subtractions

Player Transactions Citation:

See also
1996–97 NBA season

References

Houston Rockets seasons